Rochester Public Transit is the primary provider of mass transportation in Olmsted County, Minnesota with routes serving the Rochester area. As of 2019, the system provided 2,155,230 rides over 132,686 annual vehicle revenue hours with 68 buses and 10 demand response vehicles.

History

Rochester Public Transit introduced its first battery electric buses and its first 60-foot articulated buses in July 2022. The buses were placed in service on the 560X route, where they will save the agency approximately 11,000 gallons of diesel fuel annually.

Service

Rochester Public Transit operates on a pulse system from the transfer hub situated on 2nd Street SW between Broadway Avenue and 4th Avenue SW. Hours of operation for regular routes are Monday through Friday from 5:00 A.M. to 10:36 P.M. Saturday and Sunday service runs from 6:30 A.M. to 7:36 P.M.

Connections to intercity public transit are available from the downtown transfer point. Jefferson Lines buses to Minneapolis or Milwaukee stop four blocks south at 205 6th St. SW.

As of 2022, single fares are set at $2.00 for adults, $1.00 for youths and seniors, and free for children. In addition, 10-ride tickets, 20-ride tickets and various passes are available.

See also
Link bus rapid transit - A planned bus rapid transit line in Rochester

References

External links
 Rochester Public Transit

Rochester, Minnesota
Bus transportation in Minnesota